Jalan Kampung Bandar Dalam, Federal Route 2 is a single carriageway federal road in Kuala Lumpur, Malaysia. It is a hidden route to Kuantan via Kuala Lumpur–Karak Highway.

List of junctions

Malaysian Federal Roads
Roads in Kuala Lumpur